Harnessing Ruin is the sixth album by Immolation. It was released on Listenable Records in 2005. This is the bands first album with drummer Steve Shalaty.

Track listing

Personnel
Immolation
Ross Dolan – Bass, Vocals
Bill Taylor – Guitar
Robert Vigna – Guitar
Steve Shalaty – Drums

Production
Paul Orofino – Engineering, Mastering, Producer
Sven – Artwork, Layout

References

2005 albums
Immolation (band) albums
Listenable Records albums